
Gmina Fajsławice is a rural gmina (administrative district) in Krasnystaw County, Lublin Voivodeship, in eastern Poland.

Villages
Gmina Fajsławice contains the villages and settlements of Bielecha, Boniewo, Dziecinin, Fajsławice, Ignasin, Kosnowiec, Ksawerówka, Marysin, Siedliska, Suchodoły, Wola Idzikowska and Zosin.

Neighbouring gminas
Gmina Fajsławice is bordered by the gminas of Łopiennik Górny, Piaski, Rybczewice and Trawniki.

References
Polish official population figures 2006

Fajslawice
Krasnystaw County